Felipe Trevizan Martins or simply Felipe (born 15 May 1987) is a Brazilian professional footballer who plays as a centre-back for Lemense.

Career 
On 28 August 2009, Felipe Trevizan transferred from Coritiba Foot Ball Club to Belgium club Standard Liège, the transfer fee was € 1.2 million, plus an option for his old club with 10% involved in the resale.

Felipe Trevizan played in four games for Standard against German Bundesliga side Hannover 96 in the 2011–12 UEFA Europa League and left a lasting impression. After the tournament, Hannover became interested in signing him, and on 20 June 2012, Felipe joined the Bundesliga club. On 12 September 2015, Felipe conceded two penalties and scored an own goal in Hannover's match against Borussia Dortmund.

On 1 September 2020, Felipe Trevizan agreed the termination of his contract with Hannover 96.

On 14 September 2020, Felipe Trevizan signed for Turkish second tier side Boluspor.

Honours
Standard Liège
Belgian Cup: 2010–11

References

External links
 
 

1987 births
People from Americana, São Paulo
Footballers from São Paulo (state)
Living people
Brazilian footballers
Association football central defenders
Coritiba Foot Ball Club players
Standard Liège players
Hannover 96 players
Boluspor footballers
Campeonato Brasileiro Série A players
Belgian Pro League players
Bundesliga players
2. Bundesliga players
Brazilian expatriate footballers
Expatriate footballers in Belgium
Brazilian expatriate sportspeople in Belgium
Expatriate footballers in Germany
Brazilian expatriate sportspeople in Germany
Expatriate footballers in Turkey
Brazilian expatriate sportspeople in Turkey